Mina Subba (also Meena Subba) is a Nepali politician and a member of the House of Representatives of the federal parliament of Nepal. She was elected under the proportional representation system from Nepali Congress, filling the reserved seat for women and indigenous groups. She is a member of the House Public Accounts Committee. She is also a member of the Ministry of Water Supply in the shadow cabinet formed by the main opposition party, Nepali Congress.

References

Living people
21st-century Nepalese women politicians
21st-century Nepalese politicians
Nepali Congress politicians from Koshi Province
Place of birth missing (living people)
Nepal MPs 2017–2022
1955 births